Stephen Jenness (born 7 June 1990) is a New Zealand field hockey player. At the 2012 and 2016 Summer Olympics, he competed for the national team in the men's tournament.

He was part of the New Zealand teams that won silver at the 2018 Commonwealth Games, and bronze at the 2010 Commonwealth Games.  He has also played at the 2011 and 2012 Champions Trophies.  He made his debut for the national team in 2010, having taken up hockey at school at the age of 7.

References

External links
 

1990 births
Living people
New Zealand male field hockey players
Olympic field hockey players of New Zealand
Male field hockey forwards
Field hockey players at the 2012 Summer Olympics
Field hockey players at the 2016 Summer Olympics
Field hockey players at the 2020 Summer Olympics
2014 Men's Hockey World Cup players
2018 Men's Hockey World Cup players
Commonwealth Games medallists in field hockey
Commonwealth Games bronze medallists for New Zealand
Field hockey players at the 2010 Commonwealth Games
Sportspeople from Lower Hutt
Commonwealth Games silver medallists for New Zealand
Field hockey players at the 2018 Commonwealth Games
20th-century New Zealand people
21st-century New Zealand people
Medallists at the 2010 Commonwealth Games
Medallists at the 2018 Commonwealth Games